Hisham N. Ashkouri (born August 15, 1948) is a Boston and New York-based architect.

Ealry Life
Ashkouri was born August 15, 1948 in Baghdad, Iraq. He graduated first in class in 1970 with a Bachelor of Architecture Degree from the University of Baghdad and continued for his Masters of Architecture at the University of Pennsylvania under the late Louis I. Kahn in 1973. He further completed his Urban Design studies at Harvard University and M.I.T. with Masters in Urban Design in 1975.  Ashkouri completed his Doctoral work in the field of Ergonomics at Tufts University in 1983.

Ashkouri worked with Hisham Munir and Associates in Iraq before coming to the United States.  He then worked at The Architects Collaborative in Cambridge, Massachusetts, contributing to the Arlington Hadassah Way and the Westin Hotel at Copley Place, both in Boston, as well as the University of Baghdad Campus Expansion, before establishing ARCADD, Inc. in 1986 as an independent architect and urban designer.  Ashkouri has initiated several international developments mainly in Iraq and Afghanistan including the Baghdad Renaissance Plan, $13 billion, the Tahrir Square Development, $860 million, the Sindbad Hotel Complex and Conference Center, $35 billion, the City of Light Development, Kabul, $9.6 billion and the Afghan National Museum, Library and Cultural Center, $247 million, both for the reconstruction of Kabul. Ashkouri is currently working on developments in the United States.

National work
Ashkouri is the architect and developer of the Cold Spring Green townhouse development in Newton, MA - a modern, open concept design integrating green energy systems.

Ashkouri established the standard specifications for branches of the U.S. Post Office.  He contributed to the Pediatrics floors of the Massachusetts General Hospital in Boston, and has also performed restoration and renovation work on many public and municipal buildings throughout New England.

While working for The Architects' Collaborative in 1974, Ashkouri led the urban planning and design effort for the conceptual plan for the expansion of the Capitol Center for the City of Tallahassee, FL, and in 1983 was architect for the interior spaces, conference center, and guest rooms of the Westin Hotel at Copley Place in Boston, MA.

International work
Ashkouri's designs abroad include:
University of Baghdad Campus Expansion (with TAC)
Sindbad Hotel Complex and Conference Center, Baghdad, Iraq
Baghdad Renaissance Plan, Baghdad, Iraq
Tahrir Square Development, Baghdad, Iraq
City of Light Development, Kabul, Afghanistan
Afghan National Museum, Kabul, Afghanistan
Area 5 and Area 9 Parking Structures, Kuwait City, Kuwait
Regatta Mediterranean Resort, Tripoli, Libya
Noorland - a Green, New City Development, Kazan, Tatarstan, Russian Federation

Ashkouri has developed city-scale reconstruction and infrastructure plans for war-torn countries such as Iraq and Afghanistan through his architecture firm ARCADD, Inc.  He has garnered support for a number of these developments through private sector investment, and he has received insurance support from the Overseas Private Investment Corporation (OPIC) for these projects.  He has worked on promoting US-made products for these developments with the US Department of Commerce.  Ashkouri has supported private investment in Kabul jointly with the Embassy of Afghanistan in the U.S.

Competitions
His first winning design competition entry was for the Government of Iraq in 1972 while working with Hisham Munir and Associates, for the “First Oil Compound to be built for the Nation”, the Ministry of Oil and Minerals.  Other national competitions awarded were for the Baghdad City Hall, the College of Agriculture at Sulimaniyah, and the Ministry of Justice.
He was also declared the winner of the design competition for the Baghdad Opera House, but that award was rescinded when the government of Iraq realized he was in the United States. 
He won the International Design Competition for the UAE Public Library and Cultural Center, the Killington Skiing Village Complex Design Competition for Killington, Vermont, the competition for the Kansai-Khan Library in Tokyo, Japan, and the design competition for the Playground For All Children in Flushing Meadows-Corona Park in Queens, New York, the first such play area for both able-bodied and disabled children.

See also
Iraqi art 
Reconstruction of Iraq

References

External links
ARCADD, Inc.
Kabul - City of Light, 9 Billion dollar modern urban development project
Sindbad Hotel Complex and Conference Center
Architect Envisions New Baghdad
 Iraq Museum International: Interview with Hisham Ashkouri
Man With A Plan: Hisham Ashkouri
Playground For All Children

1948 births
Living people
Harvard Graduate School of Design alumni
Iraqi architects
American people of Iraqi descent
American Muslims
People from Baghdad
Urban designers
University of Baghdad alumni
University of Pennsylvania School of Design alumni
Tufts University alumni